Augy-sur-Aubois is a commune in the Cher department in the Centre-Val de Loire region of France.

Geography

Population

Places of interest
 The church, dating from the twelfth century.
 The château de Vesvre.

See also
Communes of the Cher department

References

Communes of Cher (department)